Eudonia viettei is a moth in the family Crambidae. It was described by Patrice J.A. Leraut in 1989. It is found in Madagascar.

References

Moths described in 1989
Eudonia